Gert Bender was a former Grand Prix motorcycle road racer from Germany. His best year was in 1979 when he finished the season in fifth place in the 125cc world championship.

References 

Year of birth missing (living people)
German motorcycle racers
125cc World Championship riders
250cc World Championship riders
Place of birth missing (living people)
Living people